Markondapadu is a village near by a town Nidadavole (South-West) and Kovvur (North-East) in Chagallu mandal, West Godavari District, Andhra Pradesh State, India.The businessman and industrial Sunkavalli family are from this village. This village is a bramin agharam since hundred of years who are the owners of thousands of aches  of land  . The vast water body which gets it's water from the near by Kovvada stream  which is dug during the time of Kakatiya kings of Nidadavolu , which is the in law's town of the mighty queen Rudhrama Devi.

Demographics 

 Census of India, Markondapadu had a population of 4887. The total population constitute, 2412 males and 2475 females with a sex ratio of 1026 females per 1000 males. 505 children are in the age group of 0–6 years, with sex ratio of 1053. The average literacy rate stands at 73.09%.

References

Villages in West Godavari district